A revolution from above refers to major political and social changes that are imposed by an elite on the population it dominates. It usually occurs in urban areas in the capital city. By contrast, the plain term revolution suggests that pressure from below is a major driving force in events, even if other social groups cooperate with—or ultimately capture—the movement. The phrase was coined by the Spanish writer Joaquín Costa in the 19th century.

In contrast, a "revolution from below" refers to a grassroots campaign against elites.

Examples
Enlightened absolutism in 18th-century Europe
The Constitution of the German Confederation (1871) and the formation of the German Empire
Fascism
Stalin's Collectivization of agriculture
De-Stalinization under Nikita Khrushchev
German reunification
White Revolution in Iran

See also
Revolution from Above: Military Bureaucrats and Development in Japan, Turkey, Egypt, and Peru, a 1978 book written by Ellen Kay Trimberger
Passive revolution – a similar concept associated with Antonio Gramsci

References

Political ideologies
Revolution terminology